Per Ivar Staberg (born 16 October 1969) is a former Norwegian football referee and player. Staberg officials for Harstad and has since 1995 officiated 141 matches in the Norwegian Premier League he became authorised as FIFA-referee in 2003.

He was the referee in the Norwegian Cup final in 2007.

Playing career
Staberg had besides refereeing a long career as a goalkeeper, playing for OBOS-ligaen sides Harstad and Alta until 2005.

References

Norwegian football referees
1969 births
Living people
Norwegian footballers
Association football goalkeepers